Maspeth station may refer to:
 Maspeth station (Flushing Railroad)
 Maspeth station (LIRR)